The following outline is provided as an overview and topic guide to Ayyavazhi:

Ayyavazhi – Indian belief system that originated in South India. It is cited as an independent monistic religion by several newspapers, government reports and academic researchers. In Indian censuses, however, the majority of its followers declare themselves as Hindus. Therefore, Ayyavazhi is also considered a Hindu denomination.
Ayyavazhi is centered on the life and preachings of Lord Vaikundar; its ideas and philosophy are based on the holy texts Akilathirattu Ammanai and Arul Nool. Accordingly, Vaikundar was the Purna avatar of Lord Narayana. Ayyavazhi shares many ideas with Hinduism in its mythology and practice, but differs considerably in its concepts of good and evil and dharma. Ayyavazhi is closely related to other Indian religions because of its central focus on dharma.

Theology
 Ayya Vaikundar
 Tavam of Vaikundar
 Katuvai Sothanai
 Vinchai to Vaikundar
 Ekam
 Ayyavazhi theology
 Ayyavazhi Trinity

Mythology
 Detchanam
 Detchana Puthumai
 Ayyavazhi mythology
 Chathura Yukam
 Netu Yukam
 Kretha Yukam
 Dharma Yukam
 The Naming ceremony of Santror
 Ayotha Amirtha Gangai
 Fostered by the acclaimed Deity Patrakali
 Kalimayai
 Thirukkalyana Ekanai
 Boons offered to Kaliyan
 Pushpa Vimana
 Tava lokam
 Neetiya Yuga
 Deiva Loga
 Yama Loga
 Thirumal in Thiruvananthapuram
 Swarga Loga
 Brahma Loga
 Vaikunda Loga
 Siva Loga
 Para Loga
 Vitthakalai
 Parvatha Ucchi Malai

Mythical figures
 Sampooranathevan
 Kroni
 Three God heads
 Chanars
 The Santror
 Kalineesan
 Ravana
 Kaliyan
 Kalicchi
 Punal Rhishi
 Venneesan
 Narayana
 Natalvar

Religious studies
 Ayyavazhi beliefs
 Thuvayal Thavasu
 List of Ayyavazhi organisations
 Worship centers of Ayyavazhi
 Thuvayal Thavam
 Ayya Vaikunda Avataram
 Ayyavazhi religious practices
 Ayyavazhi publications
 Ayyavazhi religious studies
 Anna Dharmam
 Ayyavazhi in reports by Christian missionaries
 Thirunamam
 Main teachings of Ayya Vaikundar
 Vaikunda Avatara Orvalam
 Kodiyettru Thirunal
 Ayyavazhi symbolism
 Panguni Theertham
 Timeline of Ayyavazhi history
 Inclusiveness and exclusivity in Ayyavazhi
 Ayyavazhi Dharma
 Ayyavazhi ethics
 Ayyavazhi phenomenology
 Ayyavazhi festivals

Scriptures

Akilattirattu Ammanai
 Thiru Edu-Vasippu
 Thiruvasakam (Ayyavazhi)
 Adiyeduttharulal
 Akilam one
 Akilam two
 Akilam three
 Akilam four
 Akilam five
 Thiru Nadana Ula
 Thiru Eadu Vasippu
 Akilam fifteen
 Akilam seventeen
 Akilam sixteen
 Akilam six
 Akilam seven
 Akilam eight
 Akilam nine
 Akilam ten
 Akilam eleven
 Akilam twelve
 Akilam thirteen
 Akilam fourteen
 Palaramachandran version
 Sentratisai Ventraperumal version
 Vaikundar Thirukkudumbam version
 Vivekanandan version

Arul Nool
 Nadutheervai Ula
 Saattu Neettolai
 Panchadevar Urppatthi
 Patthiram
 Sivakanta Athikarappatthiram
 Thingal patham
 Saptha Kannimar Padal
 Pothippu
 Kalyana Vazhthu

People
 Seedars
 Payyan dynasty
 Bala Prajapathi Adikalar

Places

 Swamithope
 Nizhal Thangal
 Pathi
 Pancha pathi
 Ambalappathi
 Muttappathi
 Tamaraikulampathi
 Pooppathi
 Vakaippathi
 Thiruchendur
 Avatharappathi
 Ayyavazhi holy sites
 Thamaraiyur
 Thuvaraiyam Pathi
 Tamaraikulam
 Poovantanthoppe
 Singarathoppe
 Swamithope pathi
 Chettikudiyiruppu
 Agastheeswaram
 Paloor
 Sundavilai
 Vadalivilai
 Kadambankulam
 Pambankulam
 Marunthuvazh Malai
 Vaikunda Malai
 Nizhal Thangal of Nelli-ninra Vilai
 Nizhal Thangal of Attoor
 Nizhal Thangal of Nadusalaiputhur
 Vaikunda Chella Pathi
 Thulangum pathi thuvaraium pathi

Philosophy
 Kosas
 Tatvas
 Neetham

Others
 Anbukkodimakkal Thirucchabai
 Ayyavazhi marriage
 Elunetru
 Muthirikkinaru
 Shamanism in Ayyavazhi
 Vatakku Vasal

See also

 List of Hinduism-related topics

References

External links 

 
Ayyavazhi
Ayyavazhi
Ayyavazhi outline